Tuuli (Finno-Permic "wind") is a Finnish and Estonian feminine given name and may refer to:

Tuuli Koch (born 1978), Estonian journalist (:et)
Tuuli Luukas (born 1966), Finnish artist
Tuuli Matinsalo (born 1970), Finnish aerobic gymnast
Tuuli Mattelmäki (born 1965), Finnish industrial designer, researcher and lecturer
Tuuli Merikoski-Silius (born 1967), Finnish middle distance runner
Tuuli Petäjä-Sirén (born 1983), Finnish windsurfer
Tuuli Rand (born 1990), Estonian singer
Tuuli Rannikko (born 1947), Finnish writer
Tuuli Reijonen (1904–1997), Finnish writer and translator
Tuuli Roosma (born 1975), Estonian TV journalist and producer
Tuuli Takala (born 1987), Finnish opera singer
Tuuli Tasa (born 2002), Estonian footballer
Tuuli Tomingas (born 1995), Estonian biathlete
Tuuli Vahtra (born 1989), Estonian chess player
 (née Tuuli Taul, born 1986), Estonian singer and poet

References 

Estonian feminine given names
Finnish feminine given names